Shirley Baker (April 22, 1895 – November 12, 1942) was an American architect. His work was part of the architecture event in the art competition at the 1932 Summer Olympics.

References

1895 births
1942 deaths
20th-century American architects
Olympic competitors in art competitions
People from Caldwell County, Texas